Mr. Sachin Puthran is the founder and director of the leading digital creative agency Thatz it, https://www.thatzit.com/

He is also currently involved as an industry expert for Miami Ad School where he trains students in Digital Art and technology.

A firm believer in the power of youth, Sachin aspires to tap into the potential of young talent. He conducts seminars and workshops that focus their energies,  to inspire and motivate students into entering, pursuing, and flourishing in digital media. 

Two of his prominent workshops are
1. Laughing Buddha 
2. Paperless Portfolio 

In 2020 he pioneered to create CONNEXTIONS - an online creative workshop format for nonacademic content with Live mentors. www.thatzit.com/connextions

Thus, he has groomed himself into a comprehensive amalgamation of the Teacher, the Mentor, and the Creative Professional; all facets which guide him into learning about and exploring his world and his work every day.

Early life and background
He graduated in Microbiology in the year 1986. After he confronted his love for art, he transitioned into pursuing a serious career in it. He applied for and got selected into the esteemed Sir J.J. Institute of Applied Art for a  BFA (Applied Art) course. He demonstrated his proficiency by securing a Gold Medal for excellent artistic understanding, which granted him a fellowship with J.J. to teach for a year. 
This early exposure awakened his deep love for teaching, which he manages to pursue even today; he is now a respected visiting faculty at various reputed art schools, viz. Rachana Sansad, Sofia, Bandekar college [Savantwadi], SNDT college, Goa School of Art, Miami Ad School [Mumbai], S.L. Raheja School of Art [Bandra] and Sir J.J. Institute of Applied Art. He later consulted ad agencies and trained agency professionals.

Career
In 1995, he started a Design Production Studio, named "Here N Now Graphix". Leading Ad Agencies approached this agency for design and 3D illustration and it won many accolades for its contribution to animation. In 1997, the agency started Animation Production and in 2001, it entered the Web Design Industry. With the advent of technology came a need of Digital Design and Puthran founded Thatz It Productions - a  complete production house that handled concept, script, shoot, edit, graphics, music, voice and finishing.

He is an active committee member of JJAAAN (Sir J.J. Institute of Applied Art Alumni Network) and Communication Arts Guild.

References

http://www.coroflot.com/public/individual_details.asp?individual_id=88903&school_name=Sir+J+J+Institute+of+Applied+Art&city=Mumbai&specialty=9&school_id=64447&c=1&
http://www.viewsline.com/Interview.jsp?id=19119&/__Sachin_Puthran,_Founder,_Thatzit_Pvt_Ltd_/__Interview_with.html
http://www.jjaaan.org/html/faqs.php
https://m.youtube.com/watch?v=kPWGLVxaFjs
https://www.thatzit.com/
https://www.creativegaga.com/product-tag/sachin-puthran/
https://www.creativegaga.com/tips-to-manage-through-the-coronaism-2020/amp/
https://m.youtube.com/watch?v=X7Adf7K3eT0

Living people
Year of birth missing (living people)
Businesspeople from Mumbai
Indian graphic designers